Tropidozineus fulveolus is a species of beetle in the family Cerambycidae. It was described by Lameere in 1884.

References

Tropidozineus
Beetles described in 1884